The Boshin Club was a political party in Japan.

History
The party was established in December 1908 during a period in which several anti-Rikken Seiyūkai groups began to coalesce in reaction to Rikken Seiyūkai's victory in the 1908 elections. Its 42 MPs were involved in commerce and industry and many had been elected as independents.

In March 1910 the party was dissolved when around half its members joined with several independent MPs and the Daidō Club to form the Chūō Club, whilst seven of its MPs participated in the formation of Rikken Kokumintō.

References

Defunct political parties in Japan
Political parties established in 1908
1908 establishments in Japan
Political parties disestablished in 1910
1910 disestablishments in Japan